Ben Stack is a mountain in Sutherland, in the northwest of Scotland. It lies southeast of Laxford Bridge and northwest of Loch More along the A838 road, and just west of Loch Stack.

It is regarded as a moderately easy walk for walkers and hikers due to its overall height and its accessibility from the A838 road. It is most commonly climbed from the southeast, following the long eastern ridge of Leathad na Stioma. A slightly steeper alternative comes from the northwestern side, starting from near Lochstack Lodge. These starting points are both located on the A838 road, thus a traverse is possible.

On 6 August 2005 former U.K. Foreign Secretary Robin Cook died after collapsing with a heart attack whilst walking down from the summit.

See also
Foinaven

References

Picture gallery
Click on image to view full size

External links
A walk up Ben Stack  with photos.

Mountains and hills of the Northwest Highlands
Marilyns of Scotland
Grahams